is a Japanese footballer who plays for Oita Trinita.

Club statistics
Updated to 1 August 2022.

References

External links
 
 
 

1989 births
Living people
Meiji University alumni
Association football people from Kanagawa Prefecture
Japanese footballers
J1 League players
J2 League players
Kawasaki Frontale players
JEF United Chiba players
Oita Trinita players
Association football goalkeepers
Universiade gold medalists for Japan
Universiade medalists in football
Medalists at the 2011 Summer Universiade